Thorsø may refer to

Thorsø, Denmark
Thorsø, Norway